Menard Independent School District is a public school district based in Menard, Texas (USA) and serves students primarily from Menard County.

In 2009, the school district was rated "academically acceptable" by the Texas Education Agency.

Schools
Menard High School (Grades 9-12).  Menard High School should not be confused with Holy Savior Menard Central High School in Alexandria, Louisiana.
Menard Junior High (Grades 6-8)
Menard Elementary (Grades PK-5)

References

External links
Menard ISD

School districts in Menard County, Texas